An encyclopedia is a type of reference work.

Encyclopedia may also refer to:

 Encyclopedia (album), a 2014 album by The Drums
 Encyclopedia (novel), a 1969 novel by Richard Horn
 Encyclopedia (TV series), an HBO television series
 Encyclopédia, a French TV channel
 Encyclopedia Brown, a book series featuring the boy detective Leroy Brown, nicknamed "Encyclopedia"

See also 
 Encyclopedic dictionary
 Encyclopedic knowledge
 Lists of encyclopedias